IRC+10420, also known as V1302 Aql, is a yellow hypergiant star located in the constellation of Aquila at a distance of 4-6 kiloparsecs of the Sun.

Discovery

IRC+10420 was first identified in the 1969 Infrared Catalogue of 2.2 micron sources.  It was quickly noted as a very unusual object after being detected at 20 microns as one of the brightest sources in the sky with a large infrared excess, and was compared to Eta Carinae during one of its outbursts.  It was also discovered to be a strong source of OH maser emission.

It was formally catalogued as variable star V1302 Aquilae.  Identification on historical photographic plates showed possible irregular variations of about a magnitude before 1925, followed by a smooth gradual increase in brightness from magnitude 15 to brighter than magnitude 14 by 1976.

Some authors had grouped IRC+10420 with the proto-planetary nebulae because of the surrounding nebulosity, but it was widely recognised as a highly luminous supergiant.

Physical properties 

Despite being one of the most luminous stars known, 513,000 times brighter than the Sun, IRC+10420 cannot be seen with the naked eye and needs a telescope to be observed.

IRC+10420's spectrum has changed from late F to early A in recent decades without experiencing changes in its luminosity. This suggests IRC+10420 is a former red supergiant that is evolving blueward on the Hertzsprung-Russell diagram to become a luminous blue variable, or Wolf–Rayet star. Models suggest it started its life as a 40-50 solar masses star that lost most of its mass due to strong stellar winds leaving it with just 10 solar masses and that the star - which actually has a high surface temperature - is totally enshrouded in the matter it has expelled appearing as a fake photosphere, so IRC+10420 appears with a later spectral type as humans see just the expelled dust and gas it has blown out during its life and not the star itself.

Surrounding nebula
IRC+10420 is surrounded by a reflection nebula with a mass of 30-40 solar masses that has been made by the material expelled by the strong stellar winds of its central star. This nebula has been studied with the help of the Hubble Space Telescope, showing a complex structure that includes arcs, rays, and condensations and that has been compared to the one surrounding the red hypergiant VY Canis Majoris.  The star and its surrounding material have been compared to IRAS 17163-3907.

References

Further reading

A-type hypergiants
F-type hypergiants
Aquila (constellation)
Aquilae, V1302
IRAS catalogue objects
TIC objects